The Partridge River is a  tributary of the Saint Louis River in northern Minnesota, United States.  It rises south of the city of Babbitt and takes a winding course primarily to the southwest, passing north of the city of Hoyt Lakes and joining the St. Louis River south of Aurora.

See also
List of rivers of Minnesota
List of longest streams of Minnesota

References

External links
Minnesota Watersheds
USGS Hydrologic Unit Map - State of Minnesota (1974)

Rivers of Minnesota
Rivers of St. Louis County, Minnesota